HMS Asphodel was a  that served in the Royal Navy and was built by George Brown and Company in 1940. She was named after Asphodel.

Design and description
In early 1939, with the risk of war with Nazi Germany increasing, it was clear to the Royal Navy that it needed more escort ships to counter the threat from Kriegsmarine U-boats. One particular concern was the need to protect shipping off the east coast of Britain. What was needed was something larger and faster than trawlers, but still cheap enough to be built in large numbers, preferably at small merchant shipyards, as larger yards were already busy. To meet this requirement, the Smiths Dock Company of Middlesbrough, a specialist in the design and build of fishing vessels, offered a development of its 700-ton,  whale catcher Southern Pride. They were intended as small convoy escort ships that could be produced quickly and cheaply in large numbers. Despite naval planners' intentions that they be deployed for coastal convoys, their long range meant that they became the mainstay of Mid-Ocean Escort Force convoy protection during the first half of the war. The original Flowers had the standard RN layout, consisting of a raised forecastle, a well deck, then the bridge or wheelhouse, and a continuous deck running aft. The crew quarters were in the foc'sle while the galley was at the rear, making for poor messing arrangements.

The modified Flowers saw the forecastle extended aft past the bridge to the aft end of the funnel, a variation known as the "long forecastle" design. Apart from providing a very useful space where the whole crew could gather out of the weather, the added weight improved the ships' stability and speed and was retroactively applied to a number of the original Flower-class vessels during the mid and latter years of the war.

Construction and career
Asphodel was laid down by George Brown and Company at their shipyard at Greenock, on 20 October 1939 and launched on 25 May 1940. She was commissioned on 11 September 1940.

HMS Asphodel was escorting convoy SL-150 with combination of MKS-41 off Cape Finisterre.  launched a torpedo which struck the Asphodel and escaped soon after. Only 5 sailors from Asphodel were rescued by HMS Clover while 92 others went down with Asphodel.

References

Sources
 
 
 
 
 

 

Flower-class corvettes of the Royal Navy
1940 ships
Ships sunk by German submarines in World War II
World War II shipwrecks in the Atlantic Ocean